Capital is a department of the province of La Rioja (Argentina).

References 

Departments of La Rioja Province, Argentina